Michael Julian Meyer (born 1 September 1992) is a South African swimmer. He competed in the men's 400 individual medley event at the 2016 Summer Olympics. He finished 17th in the heats with a time of 4:18.13 and did not qualify for the final.

References

1992 births
Living people
South African male swimmers
Olympic swimmers of South Africa
Swimmers at the 2016 Summer Olympics
Place of birth missing (living people)
Arizona Wildcats men's swimmers
North Carolina Tar Heels men's swimmers
20th-century South African people
21st-century South African people